Chrysomikia is a genus of flies in the family Tachinidae.

Species
C. grahami (Villeneuve, 1936)
C. viridicapitis Chao & Zhou, 1987

References

Tachininae
Tachinidae genera